Sihuli is a village in the Amas Tehsil of Gaya district of the Indian state of Bihar.
It is surrounded by the Kamaun range and situated on Sher Shah Suri Marg (GT Road) between Kolkata and Delhi. Sihuli is roughly 50  km from Gaya district headquarters and 142 km away from Patna.

Sihuli is mainly populated by Pathans. Shuli is surrounded by East-Kalwan, West Banat-Wahidganj North- NH2, and South by Azad bigha.

Sihuli is a place that people like to visit on holidays or whenever they feel tired and want to relax. Sihuli village is a place that is far away from the pollution and noise of the city. Also, you feel a connection with the soil in a village.

Moreover, the entire village lives in peace and harmony and there is no conflict of any kind. Villagers come forward in each other sorrows and happiness and they are of helpful in nature.

The literacy rate of Sihuli is approx 65%. Most of them are Engineers, doctors teachers, and business entrepreneurs. 

Sihuli is a Village where well-known personalities live in  MD SHADAB HUSSAIN (union leader ),FAIZAN AHMAD GYM TRAINNER ,ZAIDI HASSAN (Vechile DEALER and many more.

The main Imam of Sihuli Noori Jama Masjid is Maulana Hasim Raza Khan and Sadar Mohammad Alauddin Khan Shahb.

Mohammad Babar Khan is a newly elected Panchayat simiti member and Mumtaz Khan, Babar khan, and Fazo khan are new ward members of kalwan panchayat.

The main markets of sihlui are Sherghati, Chandiastan, and Gaya.

The famous groceries stores of Sihuli's are- Imteyaz Kirana store Araman General Store, Pappu Kirana Store, and Tipu Kirana stores.

The primary occupations are transport, the police force, and remittances from the Gulf.

A field next to a mountain is widely used to play cricket, football, and practice for police training.

Sihuli's mosque minaret is known to be one of the tallest minarets in Bihar.

External links 

 

Villages in Gaya district